The cuel are Mapuche-built tumulus. The best known cuels are near the localities of Purén and Lumaco in Araucanía, south-central Chile. The first significant studies of the cuel were published by Tom Dillehay and José Saavedra in 2003 and 2007. The word cuel is a neologism formed from the mapudungun word kuel, meaning boundary marker  according to the 18th century dictionary of Andrés Febrés.

References

Mapuche history
Tumuli
Archaeological sites in Chile
Geography of Araucanía Region
Geography of Los Ríos Region
Pre-Columbian architecture in Chile